The Vietnamese Chess Championship has been held annually since 1980 by the Vietnam Chess Federation, which joined FIDE in 1988. The federation has also organized an annual Vietnamese Women's Chess Championship since 1983.

National championship winners

{| class="sortable wikitable"
! Year !! Champion !! Women's Champion
|-
| 1980 || Lưu Đức Hải || –
|-
| 1981 || Đặng Tất Thắng || –
|-
| 1982 || Đặng Vũ Dũng || –
|-
| 1983 ||Đặng Tất Thắng|| Phạm Thị Hòa
|-
| 1984 || Đặng Tất Thắng || Lê Thị Phương Ngọc
|-
| 1985 || Đặng Vũ Dũng || Lê Thị Phương Ngọc
|-
| 1986 || Từ Hoàng Thông || Ngô Huyền Châu
|-
| 1987 || Từ Hoàng Thông || Phạm Ngọc Thanh
|-
| 1988 || Hồ Văn Huỳnh || Ngô Huyền Châu
|-
| 1990 || Hồ Văn Huỳnh || Phạm Ngọc Thanh
|-
| 1991 || Từ Hoàng Thông || Khương Thị Hồng Nhung
|-
| 1992 || Đào Thiên Hải || Phan Huỳnh Băng Ngân
|- 
| 1993 || Nguyễn Anh Dũng || Nguyễn Thị Thuận Hóa
|-
| 1994 || Tô Quốc Khanh || Hoàng Mỹ Thu Giang
|- 
| 1995 || Nguyễn Anh Dũng || Mai Thanh Hương
|-
| 1996 || Từ Hoàng Thái || Trần Thị Kim Loan
|-
| 1997 || Nguyễn Anh Dũng || Nguyễn Thị Thuận Hóa
|- 
| 1998 || Từ Hoàng Thông || Lê Kiều Thiên Kim 
|- 
| 1999 || Đào Thiên Hải || Lê Thị Phương Liên 
|-
| 2000 || Từ Hoàng Thông || Võ Hồng Phượng 
|-
| 2001 || Đào Thiên Hải || Nguyễn Thị Thanh An
|-
| 2002 ||Đào Thiên Hải || Lê Kiều Thiên Kim
|-
| 2003 |||| Nguyễn Thị Thanh An
|-
| 2004 ||Đào Thiên Hải|| Hoàng Xuân Thanh Khiết
|-
| 2005 ||Nguyễn Anh Dũng || Nguyễn Thị Thanh An
|-
| 2006 ||Nguyễn Anh Dũng|| Lê Kiều Thiên Kim
|-
| 2007 || Lê Quang Liêm || Lê Kiều Thiên Kim
|-
| 2008 || Nguyễn Văn Huy ||Phạm Lê Thảo Nguyên
|-
| 2009 || Bùi Vinh || Lê Thanh Tú
|-
| 2010 ||Lê Quang Liêm|| Hoàng Thị Bảo Trâm
|-
| 2011 ||Đào Thiên Hải || Nguyễn Thị Mai Hưng
|-
| 2012 || Nguyễn Đức Hòa || Phạm Lê Thảo Nguyên
|-
| 2013 || Nguyễn Đức Hòa || Nguyễn Thị Mai Hưng
|-
| 2014 || Nguyễn Đức Hòa || Hoàng Thị Như Ý
|-
| 2015 || Nguyễn Văn Huy || Hoàng Thị Bảo Trâm
|-
| 2016 || Nguyễn Anh Khôi || Hoàng Thị Bảo Trâm
|-
| 2017 || Trần Tuấn Minh || Hoàng Thị Bảo Trâm
|-
| 2018 || Trần Tuấn Minh || Hoàng Thị Bảo Trâm
|-
| 2019 || Nguyễn Anh Khôi || Phạm Lê Thảo Nguyên
|-
| 2020 || Lê Tuấn Minh || Lương Phương Hạnh
|}

References

Chess national championships
Women's chess national championships
Chess in Vietnam
Recurring sporting events established in 1980
1980 in chess
1980 establishments in Vietnam
Recurring sporting events established in 1983
1983 in chess
1983 establishments in Vietnam
Sports competitions in Vietnam
Annual events in Vietnam